Aleksandar Marković may refer to:
 Aleksandar Marković (conductor)
 Aleksandar Marković (politician)